2014 Kazakhstan Super Cup was a Kazakhstan football match that was played on 9 March 2014 between the champions of 2013 Kazakhstan Premier League, Aktobe, and the winner of the 2013 Kazakhstan Cup, Shakhter Karagandy.

This match was played on 9 March at the Astana Arena. Brazilian Danilo Neco scored the only goal of the match in the 68th minute and FC Aktobe won their third Super Cup.

Match details

See also
2013 Kazakhstan Premier League
2013 Kazakhstan Cup

References

FC Shakhter Karagandy matches
FC Aktobe matches
2014
Supercup